Meaux (pronounced // "") is a hamlet in the East Riding of Yorkshire, England.

Meaux is part of the civil parish of Wawne.

Meaux Abbey was a Cistercian Abbey near Meaux.

According to A Dictionary of British Place Names the name 'Meaux' is derived from Old Norse Mel-sǽr, meaning "Sandbank-pool".

Baines' History, Directory and Gazetteer of the County of York states that William the Conqueror gave the Meaux lordship to Gamel, who was born at Meaux in what is modern day France, a name he gave to the Holderness settlement which he populated with his own people. However, the Domesday Book records that in 1066 Ulf Fenman held the lordship, this transferring in 1086 to Drogo de la Beuvrière, who was also Tenant-in-chief to William I. Meaux is recorded in the Domesday Book as "Melse". At the time of the survey the settlement was in the Middle Hundred of Holderness in the East Riding of Yorkshire. Meaux contained 29 villagers, 5 smallholders, 6 freemen, and 4 men-at-arms.

In 1823 Meaux was in the parish of Waghen (alternatively 'Wawn'), in the Wapentake and Liberty of Holderness. Baines states that the Cistercian Meaux Abbey was established in 1136, and that only remains of a brick mosaic pavement had been found within "extensive" moats or ditches. Meaux population at the time was 74, with occupations including five farmers & yeomen.

Mewes (also Mewis) is a fairly common family name in the North-East, and believed to be used by descendants of those who came to Yorkshire as soldiers commanded by Gamel.

References

External links

Villages in the East Riding of Yorkshire